KMXM (102.3 FM) is a radio station licensed to Helena Valley Northeast, Montana, United States. The station is currently owned by The Montana Radio Company, LLC.

See also
List of radio stations in Montana

References

External links

MXM